The Automatic Box is a four-disc box set by R.E.M., released in Germany in December 1993. It was primarily a collection of B-sides from Automatic for the People, though disc four contains B-sides from Green-era singles (then collected on the 7" vinyl box set Singleactiongreen). "It's a Free World Baby", "Fretless", "Mandolin Strum", and "Organ Song" were outtakes recorded during Out of Time recording sessions. This is part of a Warner Bros. Records series that compiles rarities and b-sides from a specific record, also containing the Red Hot Chili Peppers' Live Rare Remix Box.

Track listing
All tracks written by Bill Berry, Peter Buck, Mike Mills and Michael Stipe except as indicated.
Disc 1 – Vocal tracks
 "It's a Free World Baby" – 5:11
 "Fretless" – 4:49
 "Chance (Dub)" – 2:32
 "Star Me Kitten" (demo) – 3:04

Disc 2 – Instrumentals
 "Winged Mammal Theme" – 2:55
 "Organ Song" – 3:28
 "Mandolin Strum" – 3:45
 "Fruity Organ" – 3:26
 "New Orleans Instrumental No. 2" – 3:48

Disc 3 – Covers
 "Arms of Love" (Robyn Hitchcock) – 3:35
 "Dark Globe" (Syd Barrett) – 1:51
 "The Lion Sleeps Tonight" (Luigi Creatore, Hugo Peretti, George David Weiss) – 2:41
 "First We Take Manhattan" (Leonard Cohen) – 6:06

Disc 4 – B-sides from Singleactiongreen
 "Ghost Rider" (Martin Rev, Alan Vega) – 3:44
 "Funtime" (David Bowie, Iggy Pop) – 2:14
 "Memphis Train Blues" – 1:38
 "Pop Song 89" (acoustic) – 3:03
 "Everybody Hurts" (live at the 1993 MTV Awards) – 4:56

R.E.M. compilation albums
B-side compilation albums
1993 compilation albums
Warner Records compilation albums